Walker Downer Hines (February 2, 1870 – January 14, 1934) was an American railroad executive and second Director General of the United States Railroad Administration.

Biography
Hines was born February 2, 1870, in Russellville, Kentucky, the son of James Madison Hines and Mary Walker Downer.

Ogden College, graduated 1888. University of Virginia, graduated 1891.

In 1886, aged sixteen, he became stenographer for the Circuit Court of Warren County. In 1890 he became secretary to the assistant chief attorney of the Louisville and Nashville Railroad at Louisville, Kentucky. He was appointed assistant attorney after graduating law school, assistant chief attorney in 1897.

He married Alice Clymer Macfarlane in 1900, they had one child.

He was promoted to vice-president of the Louisville and Nashville Railroad in 1901. Hines spent nearly ten years fighting railroad regulation in state and federal courts.

In 1906 he joined Cravath, Henderson and de Gersdoff in New York City, becoming a partner in 1907. He was with the firm for seven more years.

Hines joined the Atchison, Topeka and Santa Fe Railway as general counsel, was made chair of the executive committee in 1908 and chairman of the board in 1916.

In December, 1917, President Woodrow Wilson nationalized most U.S. railroads under the United States Railroad Administration. William G. McAdoo was made director general, Hines agreed to become assistant director general. McAdoo resigned in January, 1919, and Hines stepped in as director general for the remainder of nationalization under the Railroad Administration, which ended on March 1, 1920. Following the end of World War I, Hines worked and traveled extensively in Europe.

In the latter half of the 1920s, Hines was a director of the Chicago, Burlington and Quincy Railroad, a director of its subsidiary, the Colorado and Southern Railway, general counsel of one of its parent companies, the Great Northern Railway, and a partner in Hines, Rearick, Dorr, Travis and Marshall, which specialized in railroad law.

Hines died of a stroke in Merano, Italy on January 14, 1934.

Other service
Vice-president, New York City Bar Association; League of Nations.

Publications
 Hines, Walker D. Report on Danube Navigation for the League of Nations. 1925.
 Hines, Walker D. War History of the American Railroads. 1928.

See also
 List of railroad executives

References

Further reading

 William R. Doezema, "Walter D. Hines," in Railroads in the Age of Regulation, 1900-1980, ed. Keith L. Bryant, Jr., a volume of the Encyclopedia of American Business History and Biography (1988), pp. 201–12.
 Robert T. Swaine, The Cravath Firm and Its Predecessors, 1819-1947, vol. 2 (3 vols., 1946–1948).
 "Tells of Railroad Needs", The New York Times, October 5, 1916
 "A Railroad Man Attacks the Commerce Commission", The New York Times, February 3, 1902
 Grasty, Charles H. "One Man Diplomacy", The New York Times, July 30, 1922

External links
 

1870 births
1934 deaths
People from Russellville, Kentucky
University of Virginia alumni
Kentucky lawyers
American railroad executives
New York (state) lawyers
Western Kentucky University alumni
Businesspeople from Louisville, Kentucky
Businesspeople from New York City
United States Railroad Administration
Atchison, Topeka and Santa Fe Railway people
Chicago, Burlington and Quincy Railroad people
Great Northern Railway (U.S.)
Cravath, Swaine & Moore partners